Gina María Parody d'Echeona (born November 13, 1973) is a Colombian politician. Born in Bogotá in 1973, Parody graduated as a lawyer from Pontifical Xavierian University and became a politician. She has served as Director of the National Learning Service (SENA), as a Senator, as member  of the Chamber of Representatives of Colombia, and most recently as Minister of Education.

Career
Parody studied law at the Pontifical Xavierian University in Bogotá, obtaining a specialization in conflict resolution. She also studied criminology at the Universidad de Salamanca in Spain and political theory at Columbia University in the United States.

Upon her return to Colombia, Parody worked as adviser to María Isabel Rueda between 1998 and 2000. She later joined the political campaign for the presidency of Álvaro Uribe in the presidential elections of 2002. Uribe suggested her to run as an independent candidate for the Chamber of Representatives of Colombia in representation of Bogota for the legislative elections of 2002. Parody achieved the second highest voting turnout in Bogota, only surpassed by Gustavo Petro.

Representative 2002-2006
In congress, Parody was notable for her defense of the politics of President Uribe. She was elected President of the First Commission of the Chamber of Representatives.

Senator 2006-2009
In the legislative elections of 2006, Parody decided to join the Social National Unity Party and ran for a seat in the senate. Parody was elected and attempted to nominate herself as candidate for President of the Congress of Colombia and senate, but her party selected Dilian Francisca Toro. She was elected instead as President of the First Commission of the senate. Because of the disorder within the party, Parody organized a dissidence along senate colleagues Marta Lucía Ramírez and Armando Benedetti and chamber representative Nicolás Uribe.

In January 2009, Gina Parody announced that she was resigning her seat in the Colombian Congress. Parody's replacement is Marcos Cortés.

2011 mayoral candidacy
In May 2011, Parody announced her candidacy for Mayor of Bogota. Because she ran without the support of any political party, she collected signatures to run as a citizen movement affiliate.
She was defeated by Gustavo Petro.

2014 Ministry of Education
On August 20, 2014, Parody was appointed as the new Education Minister by President Juan Manuel Santos, replacing María Fernanda Campo Saavedra.

The Secretary of Tourism, Industry and Commerce Cecilia Álvarez-Correa Glen recently made public their personal relationship.

She resigned the Ministry of Education on October 4, 2016, shortly after the referendum of the Colombian peace process was voted as "No". It is believed it had to do with sex-ed schoolbooks called "Ambientes Escolares Libres de Discriminación" (Discrimination-Free School Environments) that were accused of promoting homosexuality and gender ideology. Former president Álvaro Uribe and former Inspector General Alejandro Ordóñez joined the campaign against said schoolbooks, even when the same approach for sex-Ed was used during Uribe's administration.

References

External links
 Gina Parody official website

1973 births
Living people
Politicians from Bogotá
Social Party of National Unity politicians
Members of the Chamber of Representatives of Colombia
Members of the Senate of Colombia
21st-century Colombian lawyers
Colombian women lawyers
Colombian LGBT politicians
Colombian lesbians
21st-century Colombian women politicians
21st-century Colombian politicians
Colombian Ministers of National Education
Lesbian politicians
Women government ministers of Colombia
LGBT government ministers
21st-century women lawyers
Pontifical Xavierian University alumni